James Ralph Spaulding Jr. (born July 30, 1937) is an American jazz saxophonist and flutist.

Born in Indianapolis, Indiana, United states, Spaulding attended the Chicago Cosmopolitan School of Music. Between 1957 and 1961, he was a member of Sun Ra's band. In the 1960s, he worked as a studio musician at Blue Note Records, recording with Wayne Shorter, Horace Silver, and Stanley Turrentine. He was also a member of Freddie Hubbard's quintet and the World Saxophone Quartet.

He went on to work with some post-bop musicians such as Max Roach, Randy Weston and Woody Shaw. Under the leadership of Mercer Ellington, in the 1970s, Spaulding played in the Duke Ellington Orchestra.  In the 1980s, Spaulding worked with Ricky Ford and, as part of an octet, with David Murray.

Discography

As leader
 1976: James Spaulding Plays the Legacy of Duke Ellington (Storyville)
 1988: Gotstabe a Better Way! (Muse)
 1988: Brilliant Corners (Muse)
 1991: Songs of Courage (Muse)
 1993: Blues Nexus (Muse)
 1997: The Smile of the Snake (HighNote)
 1999: Escapade (HighNote)
 2001: Blues Up & Over (Speetones)
 2005: Round to It Vol. 2 (Speetones)
 2006: Down With It (Marge)

As sideman
With Louis Armstrong
Louis Armstrong and His Friends (Flying Dutchman/Amsterdam, 1970)
With Kenny Barron
Lucifer (Muse, 1975)
With Art Blakey
 Golden Boy (Colpix, 1964)
With Richard Davis
 Harvest (Muse, 1977 [1979])
With Ricky Ford
Loxodonta Africana (New World, 1977)
Shorter Ideas (Muse, 1984)
Looking Ahead (Muse, 1986)
Saxotic Stomp (Muse, 1987)
With Grant Green
 Solid (Blue Note, 1964)
With Freddie Hubbard
 Hub-Tones (Blue Note, 1962)
 Breaking Point! (Blue Note, 1964)
 Blue Spirits (Blue Note, 1964)
 The Night of the Cookers (Blue Note, 1965)
 Backlash (Atlantic, 1967)
 High Blues Pressure (Atlantic, 1967)
 The Black Angel (Atlantic, 1969)
With Bobby Hutcherson
 Components (Blue Note, 1965)
 Patterns (Blue Note, 1968)
Ambos Mundos (Landmark, 1989)
With Hank Mobley
 A Slice of the Top (Blue Note)
 Third Season (Blue Note)
With Lee Morgan
 Standards (1967) (Blue Note)
With David Murray
 Hope Scope (Black Saint, 1987)
 David Murray Big Band (DIW/Columbia, 1991)
 Picasso (1993)
 Dark Star: The Music of the Grateful Dead (1996)
 Octet Plays Trane (1999)
With William Parker
 Wood Flute Songs (AUM Fidelity, 2013)
With Duke Pearson
 Wahoo! (Blue Note 1964)
 Honeybuns (Atlantic 1965)
 Prairie Dog (Atlantic 1966)
 Sweet Honey Bee (Blue Note 1966)
With Sam Rivers
 Dimensions & Extensions (1967)
With Max Roach
 Drums Unlimited (Atlantic, 1965)
With Pharoah Sanders
 Karma (1969)
With Woody Shaw
 Woody III (Columbia, 1979)
 For Sure! (Columbia, 1979)
With Wayne Shorter
 The Soothsayer (Blue Note 1965)
 The All Seeing Eye (Blue Note 1965)
 Schizophrenia (Blue Note 1967)
With Horace Silver
 The Jody Grind (Blue Note 1966)
With Sun Ra
 Visits Planet Earth (1957–1958)
 The Nubians of Plutonia (1958)
 Jazz in Silhouette (1959)
 Sound Sun Pleasure!! (1959)
 Somewhere Else (Rounder, 1988–89)
 Purple Night (A&M, 1990)
With Leon Thomas
Spirits Known and Unknown (Flying Dutchman, 1969)
The Leon Thomas Album (Flying Dutchman, 1970)
With Charles Tolliver
 The New Wave in Jazz (Impulse!, 1965)
 Impact (Strata-East, 1975)
With Stanley Turrentine
 The Return of the Prodigal Son (1967)
 Rough n'Tumble (Blue Note 1966)
 The Spoiler (Blue Note 1967)
With McCoy Tyner
 Tender Moments (Blue Note, 1968)
With Tyrone Washington
 Natural Essence (Blue Note 1967)
With Larry Young
 Of Love and Peace (Blue Note 1966)
With Kamal Abdul-Alim
 Dance (1983)

References

External links
Interview at All About Jazz
Interview at NUVO.net

American jazz flautists
American jazz alto saxophonists
American male saxophonists
1937 births
Living people
Musicians from Indianapolis
Sun Ra Arkestra members
Muse Records artists
HighNote Records artists
World Saxophone Quartet members
21st-century saxophonists
American male jazz musicians
21st-century flautists